Shovel Buddies is a 2016 American drama film written by Jason Mark Hellerman, directed by Simon Atkinson and Adam Townley. It stars Alex Neustaedter, Kian Lawley, Bella Thorne and Anton Starkman. The film had its world premiere at South by Southwest on March 14, 2016. The film was released through video on demand on October 11, 2016, by Awesomeness Films and 20th Century Fox.

Plot
Jimmy (Neustaedter), his brother Lump (Starkman), and Dan (Lawley) mourn their recently deceased best friend Sammy (Labes) from leukemia. At Sammy's funeral, however, Dan becomes jealous of Jimmy, blaming him for his death and Sammy's family wants his body to be cremated. The three receive a video of Sammy's will and testament from his phone, saying that he wants to be buried with his favorite football jersey. They notify Sammy's parents of their son's final will, but the parents do not believe that Sammy made the video willingly.

Not giving up on fulfilling their best friend's will, Sammy's sister Kate (Thorne) sneaks out of her house to team up with the three and they head to the funeral home where Sammy's body is to be cremated. They wear his jersey and retrieve Sammy's body. The funeral home's owner discovers the body was stolen and subsequently alerts the police. The four then burglarize a hardware store to acquire digging tools, attracting the police again. The four head up to the hills to bury him, but because the soil is tough, the tools break, so they decide to bury Sammy at the school's stadium construction site. The four stop at a liquor shop to buy some food to eat, and a police officer comes their way and suspects them as the ones responsible for the events in the funeral home and the hardware store, though they manage to escape.

While on the road, Dan confronts Jimmy about Sammy. When they suddenly see a red traffic light flashing, Jimmy swerves the car to avoid the intersection, causing the car to flip. Recovering from the wreck, Dan walks out carrying Sammy, and Lump's arm is injured. Kate confronts Jimmy for ignoring her after her brother's death. Jimmy convinces her that Sammy left everything that he wanted to him, and goes to find Dan to retrieve Sammy. However, Dan changes his mind, saying that he doesn't want to bury him at the stadium. After persuading Dan, he lets Jimmy carry Sammy and continues walking alone.

Jimmy is then interrogated by Sammy's father, eventually allowing Jimmy to follow his son's wishes. Jimmy steals the ambulance which treats Kate and Lump. They catch Dan and head to the stadium construction site. The four say their last words to Sammy before they finally bury Sammy in peace. They rest solemnly until sunrise and Jimmy asks them "How do you guys want to get home?"

Cast
 Alex Neustaedter as Jimmy
 Kian Lawley as Dan
 Bella Thorne as Kate
 Anton Starkman as Lump
 James C. Burns as Ted Hanes
 Jenny Cooper as Susan
 Jeff Bosley as Stubby
 Phillip Labes as Sammy
 Roberta Bassin as Mrs. Kravitz
 Senta Burke as Officer
 Thomas F. Evans as Hardware Store Owner

Production
On March 24, 2015, it was announced AwesomenessTV had acquired the script of the film which was on the 2013 blacklist. On June 1, 2015 it was announced Bella Thorne had joined the cast alongside Kian Lawley, Alex Neustaedter, Anton Starkman, James C. Burns and Philip Labes.

Filming
Principal photography began on June 1, 2015  and ended on June 22, 2015.

Release
The film premiered at South by Southwest on March 14, 2016. The film had its digital release on October 11, 2016.

References

External links
 
 

2016 films
2010s drama road movies
20th Century Fox films
Awesomeness (company)
2016 independent films
American drama road movies
American independent films
Awesomeness Films films
Films scored by Germaine Franco
2016 drama films
2010s English-language films
2010s American films